BluVinil is a Croatian rock band composed of four members: Matej Nakić, Bruno Jakelić, Marko Jurin and Ante Lovrić Tancalo. The group signed a joint record deal with Dallas Records, after forming in 2017. In 2020 the band released their breakthrough hit "Apaši". Their debut album Apaši was released in late 2020.

Career

2017–present: Apaši and Zna li itko tajnu srca?
Their debut single "Mili brat" was released in April 2017. Prior to the release of the song BluVinil was officially signed by the record label Dallas Records. Throughout 2018 and 2019 the band released four more singles, "Julija", "Helena", "Moderna" and "Sigurna u nas", respectively. The band's debut studio album Apaši was released on 3 October 2020. The album's lead single of the same name became their first song to chart on the Croatian HR Top 40 chart. On 23 December 2020, BluVinil received nominations in the categories Best New Artist and Song of the Year for the third edition of the Rock&Off Awards. In May 2021, it was announced that the band had left Dallas Records and signed a contract with the record label LAA. In 2021, two singles, "Heroji" and "U predgrađu", from the band's second studio album Zna li itko tajnu srca? were released. On 25 May 2022, the album's third single "Zasjeda" was released. Zna li itko tajnu srca? was ultimately released on 11 November 2023 on various formats through LAA. The album release was accompanied by the release of its fourth single "Boris B". BluVinil embarked on a little promo concert tour throughout Croatia in December 2022 to further promote the album. Based on the album's performance the band earned a nomination at the fifth annual Rock&Off Awards in the category "Best Pop Artist".

Musical style
BluVinil is mainly a pop rock band. Their music has been described as having a "retro feel" to it as well. The group lists the Beatles, David Bowie, Leonard Cohen, Bob Dylan and Tom Waits as their main influences.

Discography

Studio albums

Singles

Awards and nominations

Notes

References

External links

Croatian rock music groups
Croatian pop music groups
Musical groups established in 2017
2017 establishments in Croatia